Sophia Abena Boafoa Akuffo  (born 20 December 1949) was the Chief Justice of Ghana from 2017 until 20 December 2019. Prior to that, she had already been a Judge in the Supreme Court of Ghana since 1995.

Education 
The daughter of a Presbyterian minister, she had her secondary education at Wesley Girls' High School, Cape Coast and obtained her Bachelor of law degree from the University of Ghana. She furthered her education at the Ghana School of Law where she qualified as a barrister. Akuffo trained as a lawyer under Nana Akuffo-Addo. She has a Master's degree in Law from Harvard University in USA.

Career 
Sophia Akuffo worked in private practice and was appointed by Jerry Rawlings to the Supreme Court in November 1995. She has been a member of the Governing Committee of the Commonwealth Judicial Education Institute, and the Chairperson of the Alternative Dispute Resolution Task Force for several years. In January 2006, she was elected as one of the first judges of the African Court on Human and Peoples' Rights: she was initially elected for two years and was subsequently re-elected until 2014 and served as Vice-President and President of the Court respectively.

Akuffo wrote The Application of Information & Communication Technology in the Judicial Process – the Ghanaian Experience, a presentation to the African Judicial Network Ghana (2002).

Chief Justice of Ghana 
On 11 May 2017, Akuffo was nominated as the highest ranking Judge of the Supreme Court of Ghana by Nana Akuffo-Addo, subject to approval by Parliament.  She was sworn in by President Akuffo-Addo on 19 June 2017 as the thirteenth Chief Justice of the Republic of Ghana.
The last judgment she was involved in was on 18 December 2019 when the Supreme Court passed a unanimous ruling that courts could sit at weekends and on bank holidays to deal with urgent legal cases. She also spoke of her gratitude to some former Presidents of Ghana. These included John Atta Mills who was her lecturer on Taxation at the Ghana Law School and also nominated her for the African Court of Human and Peoples’ Rights in Ethiopia. She also cited Jerry Rawlings who nominated her to the Supreme Court in 1995 and John Kufuor who nominated her for the African Court of Human and Peoples’ Rights in 2006. She became president of this court with the support of John Mahama and was nominated by Nana Akufo-Addo as Chief Justice.

Judicial writings
 New Patriotic Party v Attorney-General (also referred to as the CIBA case) 1997 ICHRL 24 (12 March 1997)

Retirement 
After serving as Chief Justice, Akuffo retired in 2019.

On 28 March 2020, Nana Akufo-Addo appointed Akuffo to chair a newly formed COVID-19 National Trust Fund inaugurated during the COVID-19 pandemic.

She also serves as the chairperson of the board of the University of Ghana and holds membership on several boards of directors of various organizations.

Family
She has a daughter who goes by the name Violet Padi and two grand children Samuel Osei and Cara Nyame. She has a large extended family  including five living sisters but is seen to be closer to the three mentioned above.

See also
Chief Justice of Ghana
First women lawyers around the world
Judiciary of Ghana
List of judges of the Supreme Court of Ghana
Supreme Court of Ghana

References

20th-century Ghanaian judges
Judges of the African Court on Human and Peoples' Rights
1949 births
Living people
21st-century Ghanaian judges
21st-century Ghanaian women politicians
Ghanaian women judges
Women chief justices
University of Ghana alumni
Harvard Law School alumni
Ghanaian judges of international courts and tribunals
People from Eastern Region (Ghana)
Justices of the Supreme Court of Ghana
People educated at Wesley Girls' Senior High School
Former Presbyterians
20th-century women judges
21st-century women judges